Oisc (also Æsc or Esc, pronounced “oish” or “ash”) was an early king of Kent who — according to the Anglo-Saxon Chronicle — ruled from 488-512CE. He seems to be the same person as Ansehis (or Anschis) who is described as a leader of the Saxon invaders of Britain in the Ravenna Cosmography.

Little is known about him, and the information that does survive regarding his life is often vague and suspect. He seems to have been the son or the grandson of Hengest, who led the initial Anglo-Saxon conquest and settlement of Kent. According to Bede's Ecclesiastical History of the English People, Oisc's given name was Oeric. Bede indicates that he was the son of Hengest and travelled to Britain with him, with the permission of the British king Vortigern. He was the father of Octa, who succeeded him. His descendants called themselves "Oiscingas" after him.

See also
List of monarchs of Kent

References

External links
 

510s deaths
English heroic legends
Kentish monarchs
Jutish people
5th-century English monarchs
6th-century English monarchs
Year of birth unknown